Ajax Orlando Prospects was an American soccer team, founded in 2002. The team was a member of the United Soccer Leagues Premier Development League (PDL), the fourth tier of the American Soccer Pyramid, until 2006, when the team left the league and the franchise was terminated.

The Prospects played their home games at Warden Stadium on the grounds of The First Academy, a Christian college preparatory school in Orlando, Florida. The team's colors were white, red and black.

The team was part of the Ajax America organisation, an exclusive affiliate of the renowned Dutch football club AFC Ajax’s North American marketing and player development program.

Final squad
vs Palm Beach Pumas, 22 July 2006

Year-by-year

Competition history

Notable former players

Coaches and staff
  Greg Petersen (2004–2005)
  Mark Dillon (2005–2006)

Technical Director
  Barry Hulshoff (2004–2006)

Stadia
 Stadium at Dr. Phillips High School, Orlando, Florida 2004
 Disney's Wide World of Sports Complex, Kissimmee, Florida 2004–05 (2 games)
 Austin Tindell Sports Complex, Orlando, Florida 2004 (1 game)
 Stadium at Lakeland Christian Academy, Lakeland, Florida 2005
 Bryant Stadium, Lakeland, Florida 2005 (1 game)
 Warden Stadium, Orlando, Florida 2006

Average attendance
 2006: 60
 2005: 89

External links
 Official site

References

 
Orlando
Defunct Premier Development League teams
Soccer clubs in Orlando, Florida
Association football clubs established in 2002
Association football clubs disestablished in 2006
2002 establishments in Florida
2006 disestablishments in Florida
Defunct soccer clubs in Florida
Diaspora soccer clubs in the United States
Sports in Lakeland, Florida
Sports in Kissimmee, Florida